Géza Csapó (29 December 1950 – 14 September 2022) was a Hungarian sprint canoeist who competed in the 1970s. Competing in two Summer Olympics, he won two medals in K-1 1000 m event with a silver in 1976 and a bronze in 1972.

Csapó also won eleven medals at the ICF Canoe Sprint World Championships with six golds (K-1 500 m: 1973, 1975; K-1 1000 m: 1973, 1974; K-1 4 x 500 m: 1971, K-2 10000 m: 1973), two silvers (K-1 500 m: 1973, K-1 4 x 500 m: 1973), and three bronzes (K-1 4 x 500 m: 1970, K-2 500 m: 1977, K-4 1000 m: 1971).

Csapó was elected Hungarian Sportsman of the year in 1973 after winning three gold medals at that year's World Championships.

Csapó died on 14 September 2022, at the age of 71.

References

1950 births
2022 deaths
Canoeists at the 1972 Summer Olympics
Canoeists at the 1976 Summer Olympics
Hungarian male canoeists
Olympic canoeists of Hungary
Olympic bronze medalists for Hungary
Olympic silver medalists for Hungary
Olympic medalists in canoeing
ICF Canoe Sprint World Championships medalists in kayak
20th-century Hungarian people
People from Szolnok
Sportspeople from Jász-Nagykun-Szolnok County